Heartbeat (ハートビート) is a compilation album released by the Sonic Groove record label. The album carries various songs by past and present artists who have been under Rising Production's various labels, including Da Pump, Lead, w-inds and Arisa Mizuki.

The album contains an alternate version of Da Pump's "U.S.A", which gained mass popularity in 2018, despite low expectations upon release.

The album garnered a Christmas release on December 25, 2019.

Information
Heartbeat is a compilation album released by the Sonic Groove record label on December 25. 2019 to correspond with the Christmas holiday. The album features artists that are currently, or had been, under the Vision Factory label. These include Daichi Miura, Lead, w-inds, MAX and Folder5. 

Along with original tracks, the album featured a few remixes that had been updated for a 2019 release. Those that were given a modernized remix were MAX's songs "Tora Tora Tora", "Give me a Shake", "Tacata'" and "Ride on time", and DA PUMP's song "U.S.A".

All of the songs on the album were rearranged and compiled to create a non-stop mix, beginning and ending with DA PUMP's "U.S.A".

Track listing

References

External links
Official Release News

2019 compilation albums
Avex Group compilation albums